Dale Weiler (born February 1, 1985) is an American former professional soccer player who played as a midfielder and forward.

Career
Weiler was raised in Hudson, Wisconsin and was an All State soccer player at Hudson High School. He attended the University of Wisconsin–Milwaukee, playing on the men's soccer team from 2003 to 2006. Weiler spent the 2005 season playing in the PDL with the Chicago Fire Reserves, and the 2006 season playing in the NPSL with the Milwaukee Bavarians. He played as a professional in USL-1 for the Minnesota Thunder between 2007 and 2009.

References

1985 births
Living people
American soccer players
Chicago Fire U-23 players
Milwaukee Bavarians players
Minnesota Thunder players
USL League Two players
USL First Division players
Milwaukee Panthers men's soccer players
Soccer players from Wisconsin
People from Hudson, Wisconsin
Association football midfielders
Association football defenders